Alyaksandr Buloychyk (born 30 August 1979) is a Belarusian retired professional footballer.

External links
 Profile at teams.by
 

Belarusian footballers
FC Torpedo-BelAZ Zhodino players
FC Granit Mikashevichi players
FC Vitebsk players
FC Ataka Minsk players
FC Kommunalnik Slonim players
FC Lida players
FC Luninets players
1979 births
Living people
Association football defenders